Roquefort is a sheep milk cheese from the south of France.

Roquefort may also refer to:

Places in France
 Roquefort-les-Pins, Alpes-Maritimes
 Roquefort-les-Cascades, Ariège
 Roquefort-de-Sault, Aude
 Roquefort-des-Corbières, Aude
 Roquefort-sur-Soulzon, Aveyron
 Roquefort-la-Bédoule, Bouches-du-Rhône
 Roquefort, Gers
 Roquefort-sur-Garonne, Haute-Garonne
 Roquefort, Landes
 Roquefort, Lot-et-Garonne

Other uses
 Roquefort, a character in The Aristocats
 "Roquefort", a song by Karnivool from Themata

See also 
 Rochefort (disambiguation)
 Rockfour, a rock band from Israel
 Rocquefort, Seine-Maritime, France